Permi Jhooti is an English former footballer who played for Fulham L.F.C.. She is the first British South Asian footballer to play professionally. Jhooti is thought to be the inspiration behind the movie Bend It Like Beckham. Since retiring Permi has emigrated to Switzerland.

International career
In October 1999, Jhooti was selected for the probable squad of the India women's national football team, but has not capped in international level.

References

External links
 

Living people
People from Preston, Lancashire
British sportspeople of Indian descent
British Asian footballers
FA Women's National League players
English women's footballers
Women's association football midfielders
Fulham L.F.C. players
Chelsea F.C. Women players
Millwall Lionesses L.F.C. players
English artists
English expatriates in Switzerland
Year of birth missing (living people)